Carević is a surname. Notable people with the surname include:

 Josip Marija Carević (1883–1945), Croatian bishop
 Lazar Carević (born 1999), Montenegrin footballer
 Mario Carević (born 1982), Croatian footballer and manager
 Marko Carević (born 1966), Montenegrin politician, businessman, and football executive